Camili is a quarter of the town Ağaçören, Ağaçören District, Aksaray Province, Turkey. Its population is 997 (2021). Before the 2013 reorganisation, it was a town (belde).

References

Ağaçören District